Rudolfov is a town in České Budějovice District in the South Bohemian Region of the Czech Republic. It has about 2,500 inhabitants.

Administrative parts
The village of Hlinsko is an administrative part of Rudolfov. It forms an exclave of the municipal territory.

Geography

It lies in the Třeboň Basin.

History
The first mention of silver mining in the area is from 1385. In the late 16th century, mining had become intense, and it was the most important silver mining area in Bohemia alongside Kutná Hora and Jáchymov. In 1585, the mining settlement was promoted to a royal mining town by Rudolf II.

Sights
The main landmark is the Church of Saint Vitus. It was built as a Protestant temple in 1583. The second landmark is the building of the former mining office and until 2009 the town hall, with Renaissance decorations and a turret. Today it houses a small mining museum. There is also a small Renaissance castle, today the premises are used as offices.

Twin towns – sister cities

Rudolfov is twinned with:
 Sandl, Austria

References

External links

Cities and towns in the Czech Republic
Populated places in České Budějovice District